Haram is the fifth studio album by American hip hop duo Armand Hammer, in collaboration with hip hop record producer the Alchemist. It was released on March 26, 2021, via Backwoodz Studioz.

Cover controversy 
The album art drew criticism from animal rights group PETA, who called it "terrifying" and "cruel", and told the Alchemist to change it and "focus on the music, not the shock value of dead animals", after he posted it on Twitter.

Critical reception

Haram was met with widespread critical acclaim upon its release. At Metacritic, which assigns a normalized rating out of 100 to reviews from professional publications, the album received an average score of 83, based on six reviews.

Reviewing the album for AllMusic, Paul Simpson felt that "The result is a dizzying swirl of disembodied soul samples and hazy beats that frequently dissolve and return, as the emcees deliver complex, metaphor-heavy rhymes addressing subjects such as colonialism and white supremacist oppression." In the Review for Clash, Nathan Evans claimed that, "The best tracks on 'Haram' come together with crooked production that twitches with sharp samples and cuts, and AH’s billy woods and Elucid filling the space with pointed flows. The boys are stiff-nosed and mean-mugged, tightly rapping about dead bodies and vulgar sex to such a degree, it could classify as vore fantasy. To match, Alchemist crosses his signature style with crimson atmospheres that are as wet and eerie as a blood-soaked slaughterhouse." Concluding a review for Pitchfork, Matthew Ismael Ruiz from wrote that "Haram offers another perspective of New York City’s hard heart, rooted in ruminations on power and how it’s wielded. These are the spiritual descendants of Def Jux, rappers that not only embrace the darkness, but wear it as a protective cloak."

Accolades

Track listing
All tracks produced by the Alchemist, except for track 6 co-produced by Earl Sweatshirt.

References

2021 albums
Armand Hammer (music group) albums
The Alchemist (musician) albums
Albums produced by the Alchemist (musician)
Collaborative albums